The Chepultepec Formation, is an Early Ordovician-age geological formation in the Appalachian regions of Eastern North America. Also known as the Chepultepec Dolomite, it is a unit of the Upper Knox Group, overlying the Copper Ridge Dolomite and underlying the Longview-Kingsport-Mascot sequence. The Chepultepec Formation is a primarily limestone and dolomite formation, the earliest formation of the Ordovician period in its area. Further north, it is equivalent to the Stonehenge Formation of the Beekmantown Group. The formation was first described from Allgood, Alabama, and has also been found in Tennessee and Virginia. Allgood was originally named "Chepultepec", providing its name to the formation as well. In Virginia, the Chepultepec Formation has a habit of forming large natural arches, including Natural Tunnel in Scott County and Natural Bridge in Rockbridge County.

See also

 List of fossiliferous stratigraphic units in Virginia
 Paleontology in Virginia
 Carbonate-hosted lead-zinc ore deposits

References

 

Ordovician geology of Tennessee
Ordovician geology of Virginia
Ordovician southern paleotemperate deposits